The Latin American Film Festival (LAFF) was a film festival dedicated to Latin American cinema, held annually in the city of Utrecht, Netherlands, from 2005 to 2013.

Awards and winners

Latin Angel Jury Award 
The top prize of the Festival was awarded since 2005 by a professional jury to the best film in the competition. The prize has been awarded to:
2013: Beauty – Daniela Seggiario
2012: La Demora – Rodrigo Plá
2011: Post mortem – Pablo Larraín
2010: Norteado - Rigoberto Perezcano
2009: La rabia - Albertina Carri
2008: Las niñas – Rodrigo Marín
2007: Madrigal – Fernando Perez
2006: En la cama – Matías Bize
2005: El Viaje hacia el Mar – Guillermo Casanova

Hivos Latin Angel Audience Award Feature 
This special prize in the category "Feature films" has been awarded since 2007 to the following winners. 
2013: Infancia clandestina - Benjamín Ávila
2012: Un cuento chino - Sebastián Borensztein
2011: También la Lluvia - Icíar Bollaín
2010: Contracorriente - Javier Fuentes León
2009: Última Parada 174 - Bruno Barreto
2008: Tropa de Elite - José Padilha
2007: Proibido Proibir - Jorge Durán

Hivos Latin Angel Audience Award Documentary 
This special prize in the category "Documentary films" has been awarded since 2007 to the following winners. 
2013: Gimme the Power - Olallo Rubio
2012: Senna - Asif Kapadia
2011: Boys of Summer - Keith Aumont
2010: Hijos de Cuba - Andrew Lang
2009: Coyote - Chema Rodríguez
2008: Circunstancias Especiales - Héctor Salgado
2007: Las Estrellas de la Línea - Chema Rodríguez

References 

Film festivals in the Netherlands
Latin American film festivals
Film festivals established in 2005
Mass media in Utrecht (province)